BLAST! is a feature-length documentary by Paul Devlin. The film follows a team of astrophysicists who launch a telescope, upon a high-altitude balloon from northern Sweden and again from Antarctica. The film follows the crew of scientists as they travel on a search to answer humankind's most basic question, how did we get here? An approach rarely seen in science programming, BLAST! de-emphasizes talking-head interviews and dispenses with anonymous narration in favor of capturing the action as it happens. Through dynamic storytelling, BLAST! reveals the human side of scientific pursuit, the personal sacrifices of scientists and the philosophical perspectives of discovering the origins of the universe.

History
BLAST! premiered at Hot Docs on Tuesday, April 22, 2008. It is now playing at film festivals around the world. Festival screenings include:
Sheffield Doc/Fest 2008
Guangzhou International Documentary Film Festival
Whistler Film Festival
Documenta Film Festival
Corona Cork Film Festival
Bergen International Film Festival
Imagine Science Film Festival
Arctic Light Film Festival

BLAST! had co-production partnerships with BBC 4's documentary strand Storyville, Discovery Channel Canada, SVT Sweden, and YLE/FST Finland. The film was broadcast on Discovery Channel in February 2009. BLAST! was also acquired by VPRO-Netherlands and DR2-Denmark.

The BLAST experiment

BLAST, the Ballon-borne-Large-Aperture Submillimeter Telescope, was a 2-metre telescope flown from a high-altitude balloon to observe submillimeter radiation emitted mostly by dust heated by young stars. It was created to address important extragalactic and Galactic questions regarding the formation and evolution of stars, galaxies and clusters.

International Year of Astronomy 2009
As an official special project of the International Year of Astronomy 2009, BLAST!, screened in communities around the world throughout 2009. The International Year of Astronomy 2009 was a global effort initiated by the International Astronomical Union and UNESCO, or United Nations Educational Scientific and Cultural Organization, to help the citizens of the world rediscover their place in the Universe through the day- and night-time sky, and thereby aimed to engage a personal sense of wonder and discovery. The International Year of Astronomy 2009 was endorsed by United Nations and International Council for Science (ICSU).

Reception
Astrophysicist Neil deGrasse Tyson commented on the film by saying, "In a rare combination of content and storytelling, BLAST! treats the viewer not only to the fruits of cosmic discovery but to the fits and starts of dedicated scientists who navigate paths of research that enable it."

Tim Teeman from Times Entertainment said of the film "For those of us with bad memories of physics and chemistry class, it was inspirational and aspirational."

Simon Horsford of The Telegraph wrote that the film is "A story that, in trying to answer age-old questions about how we got here, produces an intriguing dynamic between the two main scientists."

References

External links

2008 films
2008 documentary films
Documentary films about science
American documentary films
2000s English-language films
2000s American films